I Got a Woman and Some Blues is the 21st album by American guitarist George Benson featuring performances recorded in 1969 but not released on the A&M label until 1984.

Reception
The Allmusic review states "the great guitarist always comes through with something worth hearing when asked".

Track listing
 "I Got a Woman" (Ray Charles, Renald Richard) – 5:01
 "Out of the Blue" (Henry Nemo, Will Jason) – 3:18
 "Bluesadelic" (George Benson) – 4:14
 "Durham's Turn" (George Benson) – 4:06
 "Good Morning Blues" (Billy Vera) – 2:53
 "I Worry 'Bout You" (Norman Mapp) – 2:28
 "Without Her" (Harry Nilsson) – 2:38
 "She Went a Little Bit Farther" (Mack Vickery, Merle Kilgore) – 3:08
 "Goodbye, Columbus" (Jim Yester) – 2:04

Recorded on April 30 (9), June 4 (5–8), August 19 (1), August 20 (3–4) and September 3 (2), 1969.

Personnel 
 George Benson – guitar, vocals
 Luiz Bonfá – guitar (track 2)
 Unnamed musicians – brass, saxophones, acoustic piano, bass, drums

References

CTI Records albums
George Benson albums
1984 albums
Albums produced by Creed Taylor
Albums recorded at Van Gelder Studio